Azure Lake is a small freshwater lake located in the Alpine Lakes Wilderness, between Azurite Lake and Angeline Lake in King County, Washington. A short distance south towards Iron Cap Mountain is Iron Cap Lake. Towards the North are the steep slopes of Saint Agnes Ridge which continue eastwards towards Otter Lake. Self-issued Alpine Lake Wilderness permit required for transit within the Necklace Valley area. Azure Lake is located in a prominent valley along the southern skirt of the Mount Daniel area in connection with the North-Middle Forks Snoqualmie mountain grouping area.

See also 
 List of lakes of the Alpine Lakes Wilderness

References 

Lakes of King County, Washington
Lakes of the Alpine Lakes Wilderness
Okanogan National Forest